Onalaska is a city in Polk County, Texas, United States.  Situated on a peninsula between the main channel and one arm of Lake Livingston, the population was 3,020 at the 2020 census.

History

Onalaska was struck by a F2 tornado on May 1, 1967. The tornado unroofed a combined store and post office ripped out its rear wall injuring two people. 

The town was hit by an even stronger EF3 tornado on April 22, 2020. This damaged many homes, killed three people, and injured 33 others.

Geography

Onalaska is located at  (30.807783, –95.106575).

Demographics

As of the 2020 United States census, there were 3,020 people, 1,232 households, and 809 families residing in the city.

As of the census of 2000, there were 1,174 people, 538 households, and 350 families residing in the city. The population density was 549.0 people per square mile (211.8/km). There were 961 housing units at an average density of 449.4 per square mile (173.4/km). The racial makeup of the city was 91.23% White, 6.56% African American, 0.34% Native American, 0.34% Asian, 0.43% from other races, and 1.11% from two or more races. Hispanic or Latino of any race were 2.39% of the population.

There were 538 households, out of which 20.1% had children under the age of 18 living with them, 52.2% were married couples living together, 9.5% had a female householder with no husband present, and 34.8% were non-families. 30.3% of all households were made up of individuals, and 14.7% had someone living alone who was 65 years of age or older. The average household size was 2.18 and the average family size was 2.66.

In the city, the population was spread out, with 18.6% under the age of 18, 5.5% from 18 to 24, 22.0% from 25 to 44, 29.1% from 45 to 64, and 24.8% who were 65 years of age or older. The median age was 48 years. For every 100 females, there were 93.7 males. For every 100 females age 18 and over, there were 90.1 males.

The median income for a household in the city was $28,750, and the median income for a family was $33,500. Males had a median income of $28,417 versus $23,500 for females. The per capita income for the city was $16,003. About 8.3% of families and 15.2% of the population were below the poverty line, including 11.2% of those under age 18 and 13.5% of those age 65 or over.

Education
The City of Onalaska is served by the Onalaska Independent School District.  The district is led by Onalaska ISD Superintendent Anthony Roberts

References

External links
 Official Website
 Onalaska, Texas at City-Data.com
 Onalaska, Texas at Handbook of Texas Online

Cities in Texas
Cities in Polk County, Texas